Juan José "Juanjo" Narváez Solarte (born 12 February 1995) is a Colombian footballer who plays for Spanish club CD Leganés, on loan from Real Valladolid. Mainly an attacking midfielder, he can also play as a forward.

Club career

Deportivo Pasto
Born in Pasto, Nariño Department, and a product of hometown team Deportivo Pasto's youth ranks, Narváez spent his first two seasons as a senior with Deportivo Pasto, scoring four goals; three in the Copa Colombia and another in the Categoría Primera B. He debuted for them in the Categoría Primera B on 9 March 2011 at 16 years and 25 days of age, making him the club's youngest ever player, and in the Categoría Primera A on 28 April 2012.

Real Madrid
In November 2012, Narváez joined the youth academy of Real Madrid. He was highly recommended by Real Madrid legend Zinedine Zidane to take into their youth system and was viewed as 'the next Falcao' due to his goalscoring abilities. Narváez made his debut for the club in the 2013 Copa del Rey Juvenil, where he scored two goals in three appearances as the team won the trophy, although he did not play in the final. He made his first team debut on 28 January 2012, playing the whole game in a 3–0 win over Zamalek SC in the Alkass International Cup. Narváez scored another goal against Rayo Vallecano in a 2–0 victory a week later. During the international break in October, Narvaez scored his first hat-trick for the club in a 6–1 win against Don Bosco.

 

Narváez made his UEFA Youth League debut against Galatasaray, as he managed to score the tying goal in a 1–1 draw. As of September 2013, he had scored six goals in three appearances for the U-17 squad. In a UEFA Youth League match against Juventus, Narváez scored four goals, one with a penalty, and also assisted the fourth goal in a 6–2 victory. This made him joint top scorer at the time with five goals.

In his third match representing the C team, Narváez scored his first goal against Fuenlabrada, in the 82nd minute. Narváez was once again promoted, this time to Real Madrid Castilla, where he came off the bench in the 88th minute. Narvaez would then score his first goal against Leioa in his 5th appearance.

Betis
At the start of the year 2016, Narváez signed for Real Betis on a three-year deal, being initially assigned to the B-team. On 29 January 2018, Narváez he was loaned to Segunda División side Córdoba CF, where he helped to avoid relegation in the last game of the season by winning 3–0 to Sporting Gijón.

On 31 August 2018, Narváez joined Almería on a one-season loan. Upon returning, he was initially assigned to Betis' first team in La Liga, but moved to Las Palmas still in the second division on loan for one year on 31 August 2019.

Zaragoza
On 4 September 2020, Narváez agreed to a three-year contract with second division side Real Zaragoza. An undisputed starter, he scored nine goals in his first season.

Valladolid
On 1 September 2022, Narváez signed a two-year contract with Real Valladolid in the top tier. The following 30 January, after being rarely used, he returned to the second division after being loaned to CD Leganés until the end of the season.

International career
Narváez was repeatedly called up to participate in Colombia's U20 squad, but Real Madrid refused to release him; he was not allowed to take part in the 2015 FIFA U-20 World Cup.

Career statistics

Honors

Club
Deportivo Pasto
Categoría Primera B (1): 2011
Real Madrid Youth
Copa del Rey Juvenil de Fútbol (1): 2013

Personal life
Since arriving at Real Madrid's academy, he became close friends with Enzo Fernández, the son of Zinedine Zidane.

References

External links
 RealMadrid.com Profile
 
 
 

1995 births
Living people
People from Pasto, Colombia
Colombian footballers
Association football midfielders
Association football forwards
Categoría Primera A players
Categoría Primera B players
Deportivo Pasto footballers
La Liga players
Segunda División players
Segunda División B players
Tercera División players
Real Madrid C footballers
Real Madrid Castilla footballers
Betis Deportivo Balompié footballers
Real Betis players
Córdoba CF players
UD Almería players
UD Las Palmas players
Real Zaragoza players
Real Valladolid players
CD Leganés players
Colombian expatriate footballers
Colombian expatriate sportspeople in Spain
Expatriate footballers in Spain
Sportspeople from Nariño Department